Khaled Al Shammari  (born 2 January 19 a Kuwaiti footballer who is a defender for the Kuwaiti Premier League club Al Kuwait on loan from Kazma.

He announced  from international team in 2008.

References

1977 births
Living people
Kuwaiti footballers
Sportspeople from Kuwait City
Association football defenders
Kuwait international footballers
Kuwait Premier League players
Kazma SC players
Kuwait SC players